Major-General Frederick Taylor Hobson (29 March 1840 – 1909) was a British Army officer who served as colonel of the Buffs (Royal East Kent Regiment).

Military career
Hobson was commissioned as an ensign in the 3rd Regiment of Foot on 30 October 1857. He fought at the Battle of Taku Forts in August 1860 during the Second Opium War and went on to become commanding officer of the Buffs (Royal East Kent Regiment) in 1886. He later served as colonel of the Buffs (Royal East Kent Regiment).

References

British Army major generals
1840 births
1909 deaths